Hugh McDonald may refer to:

 Hugh McDonald (Australian musician) (1954–2016), Australian musician
 Hugh McDonald (politician) (1827–1899), member of the 1st Canadian Parliament
 Hugh McDonald (American musician) (born 1950), American bass player
 Hugh McDonald (footballer) (1884–1920), Scottish football goalkeeper
 Hugh Lord McDonald (1841–1890), contractor and political figure in Prince Edward Island

See also 
 Hugh MacDonald (disambiguation)